Aimé De Gendt (born 17 June 1994 in Aalst) is a Belgian cyclist, who currently rides for UCI WorldTeam . In July 2019, he was named in the startlist for the 2019 Tour de France.

Major results

2012
 1st  Time trial, National Junior Road Championships
2015
 3rd Time trial, National Under-23 Road Championships
 3rd Overall Tour de Berlin
2016
 1st  Mountains classification Danmark Rundt
2017
 1st  Combativity classification Tour of Oman
 8th Circuito de Getxo
2018
 2nd Grote Prijs Stad Zottegem
 4th Primus Classic
 8th GP Horsens
2019
 1st Antwerp Port Epic
 2nd Le Samyn
 6th Overall Four Days of Dunkirk
 6th Paris–Tours
 9th Overall Tour of Belgium
 10th Grand Prix de Wallonie
 10th Grand Prix La Marseillaise
  Combativity award Stage 11 Tour de France
2020
 2nd Le Samyn
 3rd Overall Tour de Luxembourg
 4th Bretagne Classic
 8th Overall Étoile de Bessèges
2021
 2nd Brussels Cycling Classic
 3rd Druivenkoers Overijse

Grand Tour general classification results timeline

References

External links

 

1994 births
Living people
Belgian male cyclists
Sportspeople from Aalst, Belgium
Cyclists from East Flanders